Mountain View Unit is a Texas Department of Criminal Justice prison housing female offenders in Gatesville, Texas. The prison is located in a 45-minute driving distance from Waco. In addition to its other functions, Mountain View Unit houses the state's female death row inmates.

They do not have recreation individually. Some are allowed to watch television, though this is dependent upon agreeing to work for free, and all have a radio.

Karla Faye Tucker, executed February 3, 1998, was the first woman to be executed in Texas since 1863. The most recent female to be executed was Lisa Coleman, executed on September 17, 2014.

Inmates at Mountain View include Kimberly Clark Saenz, Yolanda Saldívar, Linda Carty, Brittany Holberg, and Darlie Routier. As of October 11, 2019, Amber Guyger, the former Dallas Police Department officer convicted of the murder of Botham Jean, is serving her sentence at the facility.

As of 2004, the facility does not have a sign on the area main highway.

On March 31, 1995, at around 11:48 a.m., Yolanda Saldivar killed the Queen of Tejano Selena at the Days Inn Motel in Corpus Christi Texas. Saldívar is currently serving her sentence of life imprisonment. She will be eligible for parole on March 30, 2025, the day before the 30th anniversary of Selena's murder.

History

The Mountain View State School closed in 1975, and its boys were sent to other facilities. The Texas Department of Criminal Justice bought the land and buildings. The facility reopened as a women's prison. The Mountain View Unit opened in July 1975.

Operation
The prison may hold up to 645 inmates. Ruth Hill of The Observer described the unit as "intimidating", saying that the "bunker-like buildings are punctuated with slit windows and wreathed in wire, with guard towers on every corner". In regard to the name, Hill stated, "But there is no mountain, and from the prison's death row, there is no view".

Around 2001, several inmates at Mountain View were in a Windham School District effort to translate textbooks into braille. These books are intended for Texas schoolchildren and college and university students. Kevin VonRosenberg, one of the coordinators of the braille program, stated in 2014 that it is a very sought-after inmate positions. Prisoners learn how to use a Perkins Brailler, then use computers to do actual work. The program was established in 1999. This is one of the largest braille programs within an American prison.

Death row

The women's death row is located in a red-brick, one-story building that first opened in 1985 to house psychiatric patients. The female death-row and psychiatric patients together occupy the same building. Plans to renovate the building first occurred in 1995 and renovation began in early 2000. The renovation cost was $95,000.

The building has a day room and a work area along with two rows of cells, with six cells each. One row is designated for women punished in administrative segregation and/or those who do not wish to work, and another row is for women who wish to work. The doors use traditional bars, unlike the men's death row at the Polunsky Unit near Livingston, Texas. The building is air conditioned, since it also houses a psychiatric unit. Amy Dorsett of the San Antonio Express-News said that the facility has "gleaming white walls, sun-filled cells, and a decorative recreation room". Pam Baggett, the warden of Mountain View, stated in 2000 that the new death row was less "homey" than the previous one.

From the early 1980s to 2000, condemned women were housed in an eight-cell building with an immediately adjacent, combined day room and work area. The communal area had a television and a center for making crafts. Mary Mapes, the author of Truth and Duty: The Press, the President, and the Privilege of Power, wrote that each cell was painted in bright colors and that the cells, which "could have been dorm rooms in a particularly austere college", had cots with "lacy touches", afghans, and "colorful pillows". She added that the death row in general had comfortable seating and was brightly colored.

As of 2004, the female death-row inmates may participate in a work program and have limited viewing of a television located outside of their cells. No television was available when the current death-row building first opened in 2000. Each death-row inmate may have limited association with the other inmates. The women on death row are permitted to knit and sew. As of the 1990s, they made dolls for sick children.

The death-row inmates use a  recreation yard with basketball hoops, a tree, and a bench.

Notable inmates

Death-row inmates
All inmates on this list are/were under death sentences from the State of Texas.

Executed
 Karla Faye Tucker—Executed on February 3, 1998 
 Betty Lou Beets—Executed on February 24, 2000.
 Frances Newton—Executed on September 14, 2005
 Kimberly McCarthy—Executed on June 26, 2013
 Suzanne Basso—Executed on February 5, 2014
 Lisa Coleman—Executed on September 17, 2014

Awaiting execution
 Brittany Holberg
 Darlie Lynn Routier
 Kimberly Cargill
 Linda Carty
 Erica Yvonne Sheppard
 Taylor Rene Parker

Stay of execution
Melissa Lucio

Non-death row inmates
 Yolanda Saldívar
 Kimberly Trenor
 Diane Zamora Zamora is no longer housed at Mountain View. She has been relocated to the Dr. Lane Murray Unit, also in Gatesville, TX.
 Christine Paolilla
 Kimberly Clark Saenz
 Amber Guyger

See also
 Capital punishment in Texas

References

External links
 Mountain View Unit – Texas Department of Criminal Justice
 List of prisoners at the Mountain View Unit – The Texas Tribune
 This article shows an image of a Mountain View death row cell

1975 establishments in Texas
Buildings and structures in Coryell County, Texas
Capital punishment in Texas
Prisons in Gatesville, Texas
Women's prisons in Texas